The Skagit Environmental Endowment Commission (SEEC) is an American-Canadian commission that oversees the watershed of the upper Skagit River in Canada and the United States. Its job is to use an endowment fund to promote education about the watershed and enhance its recreation, land management and ecosystem management.

The Commission derives from the 1984 High Ross Dam Treaty between the two countries.  In this treaty, Seattle City Light agreed for 80 years not to raise its High Ross Dam in Washington state on the Skagit River.  This addition would have flooded thousands of acres of wilderness land in British Columbia, raising opposition in Canada.

Two Delegations 
The Commission consists of 16 commissioners, eight appointed by the Premier of British Columbia and eight appointed by the mayor of Seattle.  All 16 commissioners are appointed to four-year terms on a staggered basis.

Each delegation has four Commissioners and four Alternate Commissioners who vote in the Commissioner's absence. In practice, all the commissioners participate in a wide variety of projects. Each delegation elects a Chair from among their Commissioners to serve for the duration of their term.

How SEEC Works 
The Commission meets several times a year to administer the Fund by reviewing project proposals, monitoring contracts and addressing environmental issues in the Upper Skagit Watershed. The Commission's budget must be approved by the Province of British Columbia and Seattle City Council.

The Commission does not manage any land itself. Rather, it cooperates with government agencies in both the U.S. and Canada that are responsible for this land. Most is publicly owned and administered by park agencies in the two countries.

References

External links
SEEC website
 High Ross Treaty
the Endowment Fund

Nature conservation organizations based in Canada
Environmental organizations based in Washington (state)
Environmental organizations based in British Columbia
Nature conservation organizations based in the United States